Associação Civil de Divulgação Cultural e Educacional Japonesa do Rio de Janeiro ("Civil Association of Japanese Educational and Cultural Dissemination of Rio de Janeiro"; Japanese: リオ・デ・ジャネイロ日本人学校 Rio de Janeiro Nihonjin Gakkō "Japanese School of Rio de Janeiro") is a Japanese international school in Cosme Velho, Rio de Janeiro, Brazil.

It was established on August 2, 1971 (Shōwa 46). It opened to serve employees of Ishikawajima-Harima Heavy Industries. The student body decreased after the shipyard closed in 1994. The school was previously in Santa Teresa; the former campus became the Ginásio Experimental Olímpico.

See also
 Brazilian schools in Japan
 List of Brazilian schools in Japan

References

Further reading

 "リオ日本人学校＝総領事館内で新学期スタート＝「水害にめげず頑張ろう」." Nikkey Shimbun. April 15, 2010.
From former employees:
 Yamamoto, Kiko (山本　礼二). "リオ・デ・ジャネイロ日本人学校前校長" (". Revista, Japanese Chamber of Industry and Commerce in RJ (Câmara de Comércio e Indústria Japonesa do Rio de Janeiro/リオ・デ・ジャネイロ日本商工会議所). 特集 リオ・デ・ジャネイロ日本商工会議所50周年記念誌 「創立50周年－更なる未来へ」. p. 33-35.
 小野 由香里 (前リオ・デ・ジャネイロ日本人学校教諭・大阪府堺市立浜寺中学校教諭). "校外学習を中心とした総合的な学習 : リオ・デ・ジャネイロ日本人学校6年の取り組み." 在外教育施設における指導実践記録 26, 27–32, 2003. Tokyo Gakugei University. See profile at CiNii. See profile at ETopia (Tokyo Gakugei University repository).
 今井 学 (前リオ・デ・ジャネイロ日本人学校:京都府亀岡市立詳徳中学校). "リオ・デ・ジャネイロ日本人学校の国際理解教育(国際理解教育・現地理解教育)." 在外教育施設における指導実践記録 33, 93–96, 2010-12-24. Tokyo Gakugei University. See profile at CiNii. See profile at ETopia.
Published by the school: 
 二十年の步み: リオ・デ・ジャネイロ日本人学校20周年記念誌. リオ・デ・ジャネイロ日本人学校. 1991. See profile at Google Books.

External links
  Civil de Divulgação Cultural e Educacional Japonesa do Rio de Janeiro
  リオデジャネイロ日本人学校
  リオデジャネイロ日本人学校同窓会

Asian-Brazilian culture in Rio de Janeiro (city)
Nihonjin gakkō in Brazil
International schools in Rio de Janeiro (city)
1971 establishments in Brazil
Educational institutions established in 1971